The Heroes of the Alamo Monument is an outdoor memorial commemorating those who fought and died during the Battle of the Alamo, installed on the Texas State Capitol grounds, in Austin, Texas, United States. It was designed by J.S. Clark, sculpted by Crohl Smith, and erected in 1891. The monument features a Texas Sunset Red Granite base topped by a bronze statue of a Texan carrying a muzzle-loading rifle. Among the names inscribed in the base's supports are James Bowie, David Crockett, and William B. Travis.

See also

 1891 in art
 List of Texas Revolution monuments and memorials

References

External links
 

1891 establishments in Texas
1891 sculptures
Bronze sculptures in Texas
Granite sculptures in Texas
Monuments and memorials in Texas
Outdoor sculptures in Austin, Texas
Sculptures of men in Texas
Statues in Texas
Texas Revolution monuments and memorials